Although Maine neither gained nor lost seats after the 1820 United States Census, redistricting placed two incumbents into the . Maine elected its members April 7, 1823, after the term began but before the new Congress convened. Maine law required a majority for election, with additional ballots taken if a majority were not achieved.

Notes

See also 
 1822 Maine's 2nd congressional district special election
 1822 and 1823 United States House of Representatives elections
 List of United States representatives from Maine

1823
Maine
United States House of Representatives